Philodendron appendiculatum, also known as güembé, is a perennial species in the genus Philodendron, belonging to the family Araceae. It lives in the jungles, wetlands, and moist forests of South America.

Distribution and habitat 

This species can be found in southeastern South America, in southeastern Brazil, in the states of Paraná and Santa Catarina. In Argentina it is found in the northwestern part of the country, e.g. in the province of Misiones.

Description 

This species features very large, petiolated leaves with long adventitious roots. Its flower is a monoecious spadix. Its fruit is a berry.

Uses 

It is used as an ornamental plant.

Taxonomy 

Philodendron appendiculatum was first described by Marcus A. Nadruz and Simon Joseph Mayo.

References

 Forzza, R. C. 2010. Lista de espécies Flora do Brasil https://web.archive.org/web/20150906080403/http://floradobrasil.jbrj.gov.br/2010. Jardim Botânico do Rio de Janeiro, Rio de Janeiro. 
 Zuloaga, F. O., O. N. Morrone, M. J. Belgrano, C. Marticorena & E. Marchesi. (eds.) 2008. Catálogo de las plantas vasculares del Cono Sur. Monogr. Syst. Bot. Missouri Bot. Gard. 107: 3 Vols., 3348 p.

appendiculatum
Flora of southern South America
Flora of Argentina
Flora of Brazil
Flora of the Atlantic Forest